Lotar is German, Norwegian, Polish, Hungarian and Swedish masculine given name that is a modern form of the Germanic Chlothar (which is a blended form of Hlūdaz and Harjaz). People with this name include:

Surname
 Eli Lotar (1905 – 1969), French photographer and cinematographer

Given name 
 Lotar Olias (1913–1990), German composer
Lotar Siewerdt (born 1939), Brazilian scientist
Lotar Rădăceanu, alternate name of Lothar Rădăceanu, whose birthname was Lothar Würzer or Würzel (1899 – 1955), Romanian journalist, linguist, and politician

Nickname/pseudonym/stage name
Marina Lotar, professional name of Bellis Marina Hedman, (born 1944), Swedish actress

See also 

Lota (name)
Lothar

Notes

Masculine given names
German masculine given names
Norwegian masculine given names
Polish masculine given names
Swedish masculine given names